Dendrophidion percarinatum, commonly known as the South American forest racer, is a snake of the colubrid family.

Geographic distribution
The snake is found throughout Central and South America, including Colombia, Costa Rica, Ecuador, Honduras, Nicaragua , Panama and Venezuela.

References

Colubrids
Snakes of Central America
Snakes of South America
Reptiles of Panama
Reptiles of Ecuador
Reptiles of Costa Rica
Reptiles of Nicaragua
Reptiles of Honduras
Reptiles of Venezuela
Reptiles of Colombia
Reptiles described in 1893